Headspace technology is a technique developed in the 1980s to elucidate the odor compounds present in the air surrounding various objects.  Usually the objects of interest are odoriferous objects such as plants, flowers and foods. Similar techniques are also used to analyze the interesting scents of locations and environments such as tea shops and saw mills. After the data is analyzed, the scents can then be recreated by a perfumer.

One of the early pioneers of this technology includes Roman Kaiser who used it to measure and characterize the scents of tropical rainforest.  Headspace techniques have since been used extensively to sample in vivo floral headspace of a large variety of numerous taxa and their aromatic compounds such as fatty acid derivatives (aldehydes, alcohols and ketones), benzenoids and isoprenoids.

Braja D. Mookherjee was among the earliest pioneers of this technique. It was his mission, through the use of headspace technology, to characterize the perceived change a flower’s scent undergoes after it is picked. After successfully capturing the scents, he and his team went on to further study and document these changes in fruits, herbs and other botanicals. This endeavor led way to Living Flower™ Technology, IFF’s brand name or technique for headspace analysis. Dr. Mookherjee claimed this technology would “revolutionize the fragrance industry” by bringing the scents of living flowers to the perfumers pallet.

Equipment
The headspace equipment involves a hollow dome or sphere-like objects which forms an airtight seal and surrounds the objects of interest. Inert gases are passed into the space containing the object or a vacuum is established such that the odor compounds are removed from the headspace. These compounds are in turn captured using a variety of techniques, among them cold surfaces, solvent traps, and adsorbent materials, with the latter techniques capable of longer periods of collection. The samples can then be analyzed using techniques such as gas chromatography, mass spectrometry, or Carbon-13 NMR.

Several companies have patented similar headspace technologies:
Aromascope (Takasago)
Jungle Essence (Mane)
NaturePrint (Firmenich)
ScentTrek (Givaudan)
Living Flower (IFF)

References

Perfumery
Flavor technology